Qorqor (also Romanized as Qarqar; also known as Ghorghor) is a village in Kabutarsorkh Rural District, in the Central District of Chadegan County, Isfahan Province, Iran. In the 2006 census, its population was 684, in 155 families.

References 

Populated places in Chadegan County